Crash And Burn is a music album released by the Pat Travers Band on Polydor Records in 1980.

Crash And Burn was the Pat Travers Band's highest-charting release, peaking at number 20 on the Billboard album chart. The album featured the single "Snortin' Whiskey", co-written by Travers and fellow band member guitarist Pat Thrall. This song became a significant hit on American FM radio in 1980, reaching the number one position on playlists all over the country. The album's title track was also issued as a single, but wasn't as successful as "Snortin' Whiskey". The song "Crash And Burn" was a departure from Pat Travers' usual guitar-oriented material, and was basically a keyboard song driven by the band's rhythm section of Peter "Mars" Cowling on bass, and drummer Tommy Aldridge.

Other standout tracks include a cover of "Born Under A Bad Sign", originally done by Albert King, and "(Your Love) Can't Be Right", which was also released as a single. The Bob Marley song "Is This Love?" was also included, and featured Dawn Shahan on backing vocals. The album was indeed a great commercial success, but many fans and critics alike cite several of the musician's other releases to be better overall projects. The album propelled the Pat Travers Band into headlining status in the United States but was the last recorded work to feature the popular line-up of Aldridge, Cowling, and Thrall. It earned gold record status initially, and later with the advent of compact discs, was reissued and achieved platinum record status.

The album was recorded at Quadradial Studios in Miami, Florida from June 1979 to January 1980 during breaks from touring.  Final mixes were done at Bayshore Studios in Coconut Grove, Florida, in February 1980, and the album was released in April 1980.

Track listing 
All tracks composed by Pat Travers; except where indicated
 "Crash And Burn" – 5:21
 "(Your Love) Can't Be Right" – 3:34
 "Snortin' Whiskey" (Pat Thrall, Travers) – 3:29
 "Born Under a Bad Sign" (William Bell, Booker T. Jones) – 5:51
 "Is This Love?"  (Bob Marley) – 5:30
 "The Big Event" – 5:37
 "Love Will Make You Strong" – 4:06
 "Material Eyes" (Alex Kash, Thrall) – 5:53

Personnel 

 Tommy Aldridge - drums, percussion
 Peter "Mars" Cowling - bass guitar
 Pat Thrall - lead & rhythm guitars, backing vocals
 Pat Travers - lead & backing vocals, lead & rhythm guitars, keyboards

Additional Personnel
 Dawn Shahan - backing vocals
 Michael Shrieve - percussion
 Greg Calbi, David Gotlieb, Dennis Mackay & Eric Schilling - engineers

Charts 
Album - Billboard

References 

1980 albums
Pat Travers albums
Polydor Records albums